Brahea is a genus of palms in the family Arecaceae. They are commonly referred to as hesper palms and are endemic to Mexico and Central America. All Hesper Palms have large, fan-shaped leaves.
The generic name honours Danish astronomer Tycho Brahe (1546-1601).

Species

Formerly placed here
Washingtonia filifera (Linden ex André) H.Wendl. (as B. filamentosa (H.Wendl. ex Franceschi) H.Wendl. ex Kuntze)

References

External links

Royal Botanic Gardens, Kew - ePIC: Brahea

 
Arecaceae genera
Neotropical realm flora